The Basketbol Süper Ligi season assists leader, is the season assists per game leader of the Turkish top-tier level professional basketball league, the Basketbol Süper Ligi (BSL).

Assists leaders

References

External links 
  Turkish Basketball Super League official website
  Turkish Basketball Federation official website

Turkish Basketball Super League
Turkish Basketball Super League statistical leaders